Abbey Farmhouse is a detached house in Montacute, Somerset, England, which incorporates the gateway of the medieval Montacute Priory. It was built in the 16th century and has been designated as a Grade I listed building.

After the dissolution of the monasteries the property became a farmhouse, but by 1633 it was 'almost desolate'. By 1782 it was a revitalised farm, remaining part of the Phelips estate until 1918.

A long-distance public footpath, the Monarch's Way runs along the course of a Roman (or earlier) trackway immediately in front of the building. This path leads to Ham Hill Country Park via fields and woodland

See also
 List of Grade I listed buildings in South Somerset

References

Buildings and structures completed in the 16th century
Grade I listed buildings in South Somerset
Grade I listed houses in Somerset
16th-century architecture in England
Farmhouses in England